Andreas "Andy" Kapp (born 8 December 1967) is a German curler from Unterthingau. After a number of several tournaments at the Junior, Olympic and World Championship levels, Kapp surprised many by winning the 1992 European championship. The next year however, he finished only 7th, but at the 1994 World Championships he and his team won the bronze medal. The next year, Kapp would go on to win the bronze medal once again. Two years later, at the 1997 World Championships, Kapp achieved his best showing at a World Championship, as he led his team to a silver medal, losing to Sweden's Peja Lindholm in the final. Kapp would also win his second European championships in December that year, soon before the first ever official medal Olympics for curling in Nagano.  He would have a disappointing 1998 Olympics though where as one of the top medal favorites he went 1-6, finishing in last place in the 8-team field.

In the following years, Kapp was representing Germany at World- and European Championships with no podiumplaces. From 2002 the emergence of young German star Sebastian Stock started a new chapter  in German curling, and the country's representative at most major events such as Europeans, Worlds, and Olympics were not the Kapp brothers anymore.   However, in 2005 Kapp was back, at the 2005 Ford World Men's Curling Championship, and won a bronze medal after play-off losses to Scotland's David Murdoch and Canada's Randy Ferbey. The semifinal against Ferbey is remembered most for third Uli on his first shot shockingly playing the wrong turn altogether on a shot in the final end, up 6-5 without hammer, leading to a disastrous miss and putting Germany in a near-impossible position for the remainder of the end and leading to their loss with Ferbey scoring 3.  He appeared in his second Olympics in Turin in 2006 finishing out of playoff contention at 3-6.

Two years later, at the 2007 Ford World Men's Curling Championship, Kapp skipped Germany to another silver medal, losing to Canada's Glenn Howard in the final 8-3. The team returned to the 2008 World Men's Curling Championship without Andy's brother (and regular third) Uli, who was sidelined by season-ending knee surgery. Nevertheless, the team got off to a 4-0 start before fading and finishing in 8th place with a 5-6 record. Kapp (again without Uli) competed at a third Olympics for Germany in 2010 in Vancouver,  this time finished with his best ever Olympic record of 4-5, missing a tiebreaker to get into the playoffs by just 1 game.  He played 2011 his 14th and last World Men´s Championship in Regina/Canada and fished 6th place. After that Kapp did win the European Mixed Championship 2013 with Pia-Lisa Schöll, Holger, Höhne and Petra Tschetsch and finished 5th at the World Mixed Championship 2015 and 2016. He is now coach of the National Junior programme in Germany.

Kapp was the coach of the German men's team at the 2019 World Men's Curling Championship; his 16-year-old son Benjamin Kapp was an alternate on the team and the youngest player in the event.

Teammates (1992-2005)
 Uli Kapp (third)
 Oliver Axnick (second)
 Holger Höhne (lead)

Teammates (as of 2007)
 Uli Kapp (third)
 Andreas Lang (second)
 Andreas Kempf (lead)
 Holger Höhne (alternate)

Teammates at the 2010 Vancouver Winter Olympics
 Andreas Lang (third)
 Holger Höhne (second)
 Andreas Kempf (lead)
 Daniel Herberg (alternate)

References

External links

 Video: 

1967 births
Living people
German male curlers
Curlers at the 2006 Winter Olympics
Curlers at the 1998 Winter Olympics
Olympic curlers of Germany
Curlers at the 2010 Winter Olympics
Sportspeople from Swabia (Bavaria)
European curling champions
German curling champions
German curling coaches
People from Ostallgäu